The Agnew Funeral E.P. is a 1995 extended play from Lotion, released through spinART Records.

Track listing
All songs composed by Lotion, except where noted
"Marijuana Vietnam" – 4:49
"Walk Away Renée" (Michael Brown, Bob Calilli, and Michael Lookofsky)  – 2:47
"Switch" – 2:48
"Famous Redheads" – 5:12
"Treat Me" – 5:41
"Untitled" – 22:44

The 10" EP version excludes "Untitled".

Personnel
Lotion
Bill Ferguson – bass guitar
Jim Ferguson – guitar
Rob Youngberg – drums
Tony Zajkowski – vocals

Additional musicians
Joe McGinty – synthesizer
Kurt Ralske – flugelhorn

References 

1995 EPs
Lotion (band) albums
SpinART Records EPs